KSNX (105.5 FM) is a commercial classic hits music radio station in Heber, Arizona. It is owned by Henry A. Ash, through licensee Petracom of Holbrook, LLC.

References

External links
105.5 KSNX Facebook
 KSNX Website

Classic hits radio stations in the United States
SNX
Mogollon Rim
White Mountains (Arizona)